São Gonçalo do Amarante, Ceará is a municipality in the state of Ceará in the Northeast region of Brazil.

In this municipality is located the Port of Pecem, one of the two big ports of the state of Ceará.

See also
List of municipalities in Ceará

References

Municipalities in Ceará
Populated coastal places in Ceará